The 2017 Tianjin Open was a women's professional tennis tournament played on hard courts. It was the 4th edition of the tournament, and part of the 2017 WTA Tour. It took place at the Tuanbo International Tennis Centre in Tianjin, China between 9 and 15 October 2017.

Points and prize money

Point distribution

Prize money

1 Qualifiers prize money is also the Round of 32 prize money
* per team

Singles main-draw entrants

Seeds 

 1 Rankings are as of October 2, 2017

Other entrants 

The following players received wildcards into the singles main draw: 
 Liu Fangzhou 
 Maria Sharapova
 Wang Xiyu

The following players received entry from the qualifying draw:
 Lauren Davis
 Sara Errani
 Guo Hanyu
 Lu Jingjing
 Arina Rodionova
 Stefanie Vögele

The following player received entry as lucky loser:
  Han Xinyun

Withdrawals 
Before the tournament
  Misaki Doi →replaced by  Kristie Ahn
  Caroline Garcia →replaced by  Han Xinyun
  Sabine Lisicki →replaced by  Zhu Lin
  Evgeniya Rodina →replaced by  Aryna Sabalenka

Doubles main-draw entrants

Seeds 

1 Rankings are as of October 2, 2017

Champions

Singles 

  Maria Sharapova def.  Aryna Sabalenka, 7–5, 7–6 (10–8)

Doubles 

  Irina-Camelia Begu /  Sara Errani def.  Dalila Jakupović /  Nina Stojanović, 6–4, 6–3

External links 
 

Tianjin Open
Tianjin Open
Tianjin Open
Tianjin Open